Jacob Collamer is a marble statue of Jacob Collamer by Preston Powers, installed in the United States Capitol, in Washington D.C., as part of the National Statuary Hall Collection. It is one of two statues donated by the state of Vermont.  The statue was accepted in the collection by Alexander H. Stephens in 1881.

References

External links
 

1881 establishments in Washington, D.C.
1881 sculptures
Marble sculptures in Washington, D.C.
Monuments and memorials in Washington, D.C.
Collamer, Jacob
Sculptures of men in Washington, D.C.